Egor Alekseevich Orudzhev (born 16 October 1995) is a Russian racing driver.

Career

Karting
Born in Saint Petersburg, Orudzhev entered karting in 2006, when he finished as runner-up in the Russian Karting Championship in the Mini Class, before he became champion in the Russian KF3 Championship in 2009. Also in 2009 he moved to the international scene, where he competed in the KF3 category as well. He progressed into the KF2 category in 2011, when he finished third in the WSK Euro Series.

Formula Renault
In 2012, Orudzhev made his début in single-seaters, taking part in the French F4 Championship. He closed the top ten in the series standings with seven point-scoring finishes, including two podiums – a second and a third – at the Bugatti Circuit. He also contested single rounds in both Formula Renault 2.0 Alps and Eurocup Formula Renault 2.0 with AV Formula and Fortec Motorsports respectively.

For 2013, Orudzhev moved to Tech 1 Racing for full-season campaigns in the Eurocup Formula Renault 2.0 and Formula Renault 2.0 Alps. In the Eurocup, he took a podium finish in the opening race of the season at Motorland Aragon, as well as another eight point-scoring finishes. In the Alps championship, he finished fifth with two podiums at Misano and Imola.

Orudzhev stayed with Tech 1 for the 2014 season.

Toyota Racing Series
During the 2014 off-season Orudzhev competed in the New Zealand-based Toyota Racing Series with M2 Competition. He won three races and scored another five podiums on his way to sixth place in the series.

Formula Three
Orudzhev made his Formula Three début in 2014 in the British Formula 3 Championship, racing for Carlin. He won his inaugural race at Silverstone, starting from front row.

Racing record

Career summary

† As Orudzhev was a guest driver, he was ineligible to score points.

Complete World Series Formula V8 3.5 results
(key) (Races in bold indicate pole position) (Races in italics indicate fastest lap)

Complete European Le Mans Series results

Complete FIA World Endurance Championship results

24 Hours of Le Mans results

References

External links
 

1995 births
Living people
Sportspeople from Saint Petersburg
Russian racing drivers
French F4 Championship drivers
Formula Renault 2.0 Alps drivers
Formula Renault Eurocup drivers
Toyota Racing Series drivers
British Formula Three Championship drivers
World Series Formula V8 3.5 drivers
European Le Mans Series drivers
FIA World Endurance Championship drivers
24 Hours of Le Mans drivers
Carlin racing drivers
Arden International drivers
SMP Racing drivers
Russian Circuit Racing Series drivers
Auto Sport Academy drivers
AV Formula drivers
Tech 1 Racing drivers
M2 Competition drivers
Fortec Motorsport drivers